Владислав Бульин (born May 18, 1972 in Penza, U.S.S.R.) is a former Russian professional ice hockey defenceman who played in the Russian Superleague and Kontinental Hockey League (KHL).

Playing career
Bulin was drafted 103rd overall in the 5th round by the Philadelphia Flyers in the 1992 NHL Entry Draft. Boulin began his career with HC Dynamo Moscow of the Russian Super League, where he played two seasons. He then spent three seasons in the American Hockey League, two with the Hershey Bears, and one with the Philadelphia Phantoms. He split the 1997-98 season with Star Bulls Rosenheim of the Deutsche Eishockey Liga and Michigan K-Wings of the International Hockey League. He returned to the RSL for the 1998-99 season, playing for SKA Saint Petersburg, then went back to the DEL for 1999-2000. He played with Augsburger Panther that season, and the Hannover Scorpions the next. He finally returned once again to the RSL for 2001-02, playing two seasons for Lada Togliatti. He spent the 2003–04 and 2004-05 seasons once again with HC Dynamo Moscow, and has been with Metallurg Magnitogorsk every season since.

Career statistics

Regular season and playoffs

International

External links
 

1972 births
Augsburger Panther players
Dizel Penza players
Hannover Scorpions players
HC Dynamo Moscow players
HC Lada Togliatti players
HC Neftekhimik Nizhnekamsk players
Metallurg Magnitogorsk players
Hershey Bears players
Kalamazoo Wings (1974–2000) players
Living people
Philadelphia Flyers draft picks
Philadelphia Phantoms players
Russian ice hockey coaches
Russian ice hockey defencemen
SKA Saint Petersburg players
Soviet ice hockey defencemen
Starbulls Rosenheim players